Canon Thomas Allen Blyth DD (7 January 1844 – 19 July 1913), author, historian, editor of the Worcester Diocesan Calendar (1889), Hon. Canon of Worcester Cathedral (1898), examining Chaplain and Commissary to the Archbishop of Ottawa, Commissary to the Bishops of Niagara (from 1890) and Surrogate to the Diocese of Worcester (from 1900).

Early life
Thomas Allen Blyth was born in London on 7 January 1844, the second son of Henry Ralph Blyth of Wivenhoe, Beaumont, London and Bedford.  He was educated at Bedford Modern School and Queen's College, Oxford (BA (Hons in Theology) 1882, MA 1885, BD 1888, DD 1892).

Career
Blyth was an Assistant Master at the Bedford Schools (1865–75) and ordained in 1875.  He was Curate of Wymondham, Norfolk (1875–77), Clifton-upon-Dunsmore (1877–78), Thame (1879–81) and St Saviour in the Parish of Upper Chelsea (1884–85).
He was a Fellow of the Educational Institute of Scotland (1870); Hon. Fellow Academy of Roman Citizens (1870); PhD and MA, University of Göttingen (1870).

Blyth was Vice-Chairman of the Foleshill Board of Guardians (1887–92) and was made editor of the Worcester Diocesan Calendar in 1889. He was Hon. Canon of Worcester Cathedral (1898), examining Chaplain and Commissary to the Archbishop of Ottawa, Commissary to the Bishops of Niagara (from 1890), Chairman of the Stoke School Board (1897–99) and Surrogate to the Diocese of Worcester (from 1900).

Blyth was made a Doctor of Divinity of the University of Durham in 1901 and was a senior fellow of the Geological Society of Edinburgh. In addition to his official church duties, Blyth was an author, translator and historian producing 38 works in 61 publications, many Latin translations.

Family life
Blyth married Mary Jane, 3rd daughter of John Hands of Grandborough House, Grandborough, Warwickshire.  They had a son and a daughter.  He died on 19 July 1913.

Bibliography
 Sir William Harpur, Lord Mayor of London in 1561.  Published 1864
 John Bunyan and his Church
 The Stranger's Guide to the Bedford Schools, 1864
 Burt's Bedford Directory and History of the Churches of Bunyan, Howard, and Wesley; John Jukes, 1866
 The Bedford Directory and Almanac, 1866
 Carter's Directory and History of the Ancient Parish Churches of Bedford, 1869
 Metallography as a Separate Science, 1871
 The History of Bedford, 1873; John Huss, 1879
 Plato’s Meno, literally translated
 The Oxford Logic Chart
 Terence's Andria, Phormio, and Heauton Timorumenos, literally translated
 The Oxford Handbook of Logic, 1880
 Xenophon’s Memorabilia, I, II, IV, literally translated
 The Undergraduate's Guide to the Holy Gospels
 Lecture Notes on Human Physiology, 1881
 Questions and Exercises in Advanced Logic, 1881
 Rudiments of Faith and Religion
 Guide to Matriculation and Responsions at Oxford
 Livy's History of Rome, XXI, XXII, XXIII, literally translated, 1882
 Homer’s Iliad, I to IV, Cæsar de Bello Gallico, I to IV, literally translated, 1883
 Plato’s Apology of Socrates, literally translated, 1884
 Handbook for the Clergy, 1893
 The History of Stoke-in-Coventry, 1897
 The Thirty-nine Articles, 3rd edn, 1899
 Editor, Oxford Translations of the Classics
 The Oxford Science Primers
 Oxford Aids to The Schools, 1878–85

External links
 Thomas Allen Blyth at WorldCat Identities

References

1844 births
1913 deaths
People educated at Bedford Modern School
Alumni of The Queen's College, Oxford
19th-century English Anglican priests